Stockholm Institute for Scandinavian Law is a foundation affiliated to the Law Faculty at Stockholm University. The overall objective of the Institute is to disseminate knowledge about Scandinavian law and jurisprudence abroad by presenting Scandinavian law and legal theory to a wide readership in the English language. The Institute publishes Scandinavian Studies in Law (Sc.St.L.), a series of books presenting articles by Scandiavian jurists and legal experts.

The Institute is led by an editorial board. The work is administrated by an appointed editor, and all activities of the Institute are conducted under the auspices of the  Stockholm University's Law Faculty.  The Stockholm Institute for Scandinavian Law was established in 1956. The founder of the Institute was the late professor Folke Schmidt, a revered scholar at the Stockholm University.

Scandinavian Law
In this context, Scandinavia is used as a generic term denoting five European countries: Denmark, Finland,  Iceland, Norway, and Sweden. Denmark, Finland and Sweden are members of the European Union, Norway and Iceland are related to the community law via the EEA-agreement, creating the European Economic Area. Geographically, the Scandinavian peninsula comprises Norway and Sweden and the northernmost part of Finland.

To a large extent the Scandinavian countries have a common legal tradition and a history of extensive co-operation in many administrative matters. The Scandinavian countries share to a large extent their history, and are closely related by language and culture. Scandinavian law reflects therefore vivid traditions in legislative, administrative, and jurisprudential matters.

Scandinavian Studies in Law
The Institute publishes Scandinavian Studies in Law (Sc.St.L.), a series of books comprising articles on a variety of legal subjects. The Institute is led by an editorial board. The work is administrated by an appointed editor, and all activities of the Institute are conducted under the auspices of the  Stockholm University's Law Faculty.

The series presents articles by Scandinavian jurists and lawyers. The first volume of Sc.St.L. was published in 1957. Since the beginning of the series more than 600 articles have been published.  Volumes 1-37, issued between 1957 and 1993, were yearbooks of a conventional kind, each reflecting a variety of legal topics. Beginning with volume 38 the material in the series has been arranged according to topic. A strategy making it possible to present more thorough and updated descriptions of developments in different legal sub-fields.

Editor and Editorial Board
The editor and editorial board of Stockholm Institute for Scandinavian Law is appointed by the Stockholm University's Law Faculty. Editors of the series have been Folke Schmidt, Professor of Private Law (1956-1980); Anders Victorin, Professor of Private Law (1980-1995); and Bill W. Dufwa, Professor of Insurance Law. The present editor is: Peter Wahlgren, LL.D., Professor, Law and Information Technology.

The present members of the editorial board are: Ulf Bernitz, LL.D., Professor emeritus in European Law, Stockholm University; Peter Seipel, LL.D., Professor in Law and Information Technology, Stockholm University; and Said Mahmoudi, LL.D., Professor in International Law, Stockholm University.

Financial support for the publishing of the series Scandinavian Studies in Law has been provided by the Association for the Publishing of Svensk Juristtidning, the Edvard Cassel Foundation, the Emil Heijne Foundation, the Swedish Council for Research in the Humanities and Social Sciences, and the Stockholm University Law Faculty Publishing Trust.

The Advisory Committee consists of Viðar Már Matthíasson, Iceland, Ruth Nielsen, Denmark, Tuomas Pöysti, Finland, and Ole-Andreas Rognstad, Norway.

Contributors
The series Scandinavian Studies in Law presents articles by Scandinavian jurists and legal experts. The series covers all aspects of the law. The vast majority of the contributions are written by academic scholars. Occasionally, articles by distinguished practitioners are also presented. 
Most of the articles presented in the series have never been published before, while some articles, previously published in the Scandinavian countries, have been updated and translated into English for the present series.

Content
Volume 1-37 are available in full-text format at the Institute's homepage. As new volumes are being published, more volumes are added to the full-text section. Recent volumes:

 Volume 38 - Legal Issues of the Late 1990s (1999), Wahlgren, Peter (ed.) 
 Volume 39 - International Aspects (2000), Wahlgren, Peter (ed.) 
 Volume 40 - Legal Theory (2000), Wahlgren, Peter (ed.) 
 Volume 41 - Tort Liability and Insurance (2001), Wahlgren, Peter (ed.) 
 Volume 42 - Intellectual Property (2003), Wahlgren, Peter (ed.) 
 Volume 43 - Stability and Change in Nordic Labour Law (2002), Wahlgren, Peter (ed.) 
 Volume 44 - Tax Law (2003), Wahlgren, Peter (ed.) 
 Volume 45 - Company Law (2004), Wahlgren, Peter (ed.) 
 Volume 46 - Maritime & Transport Law : Bar Associations (2004), Wahlgren, Peter (ed.) 
 Volume 47 - IT Law (2004), Wahlgren, Peter (ed.) 
 Volume 48 - Perspectives on Jurisprudence : Essays in Honor of Jes Bjarup (2005), Wahlgren, Peter (ed.) 
 Volume 49 - A Proactive Approach : Law Libraries (2006), Wahlgren, Peter (ed.) 
 Volume 50 - What is Scandinavian Law: Social Private Law (2007), Wahlgren, Peter (ed.) 
 Volume 51 - Procedural Law : Court Administrations (2007), Wahlgren, Peter (ed.) 
 Volume 52 - Constitutional Law : Constitutions (2007), Wahlgren, Peter (ed.)

Stockholm University
Research institutes established in 1956
Research institutes in Sweden
Legal research institutes
Scandinavian law